Bromus aleutensis, commonly known as the Aleutian brome, is a perennial grass found in North America. B. aleutensis has a diploid number of 56.

Taxonomy

It has been suggested that Bromus aleutensis may be a modified version of the similar Bromus sitchensis in which reproduction occurs at an earlier developmental state as a response to the climate of the Aleutian Islands.

Description

B aleutensis is a perennial grass that is loosely cespitose. The striate and pilose leaf sheaths have dense hairs. Auricles are rarely present. The glumes are glabrous or pubescent, with the three- to five-veined lower glumes being  and the seven- to nine-veined upper glumes being . The lemmas have nine to eleven veins, with the veins being especially conspicuous distally.

Habitat and distribution

Bromus aleutensis grows in sand, gravel, and disturbed soil in the Pacific coast, particularly from the Aleutian Islands (as its specific epithet indicates) to western Washington, though it has been found farther east in lake shores or road edges of Canada and Idaho.

Ecology

Bromus aleutensis is infected by Fusarium nivale and Hendersonia culmicola.

References

aleutensis
Grasses of the United States
Grasses of Canada
Plants described in 1854